Susheela Jayapal (born October 31, 1962) is an American politician. Since January 2019, Jayapal has been serving as a county commissioner for Multnomah County, Oregon, the state's most populous county. She is the first Indian American to hold an elected office at the county level in Oregon. She is the older sister of U.S. Representative Pramila Jayapal.

Early life and education
Jayapal was born in Coimbatore, India. Growing up, her family frequently moved due to her father's job, and she lived in Bangalore as well as Jakarta and Singapore as a child. She graduated high school in Jakarta and came to the United States to attend Swarthmore College at the age of 16. After graduating from Swarthmore with a degree in economics at age 20, Jayapal got a job working for Goldman Sachs. She quickly became disillusioned with the job and decided to get a Juris Doctor, graduating from the University of Chicago Law School in 1988.

Jayapal moved to San Francisco, where she worked as a litigator and started a family, and then to Portland in 1994, working at the law firm Ater Wynne. She then moved to Adidas, leading its legal department. She worked for several Portland-area nonprofits after quitting Adidas.

Jayapal's sister, Pramila, was elected to the U.S. House of Representatives from Washington in 2016. While Susheela was initially reluctant to get involved in politics, she was persuaded to run after Donald Trump took office as president, and won a seat on the Multnomah County Commission in May 2018 with 24,543 votes (61.63%), defeating three other candidates.

Personal life
Jayapal married Bradley Stuart Miller in 1988 and divorced in 2014. She has two children and lives in the Sabin neighborhood of Portland.

Electoral history

References

External links
 Website at Multnomah County

Living people
1962 births
21st-century American politicians
21st-century American women politicians
American politicians of Indian descent
Asian-American people in Oregon politics
Indian emigrants to the United States
Multnomah County Commissioners
Oregon Democrats
People from Coimbatore
Politicians from Portland, Oregon
Swarthmore College alumni
University of Chicago Law School alumni
Women in Oregon politics